Serenade for wind instruments, cello and double bass in D minor, Op. 44, B. 77, is a chamber composition by the Czech composer Antonín Dvořák. The work is dedicated to the music critic and composer Louis Ehlert who praised the Slavonic Dances highly in the German press.

It was created in 1878, shortly after the première of the opera The Cunning Peasant, one of fifteen compositions he submitted for the Austrian State Stipendium award. The work was first heard on 17 November 1878 at a concert exclusively dedicated to Dvořák's works, with the  orchestra of the Prague Provisional Theatre. The composition was performed under the composer's baton.

The Serenade evokes the old-world atmosphere of musical performances at the castles of the Rococo period, where the worlds of the aristocracy and the common folk merged. It is composed in a 'Slavonic' style (shortly before the Slavonic Dances), though not quoting folksong directly; and the middle part of the second movement contains rhythms reminiscent of the furiant dance.

Structure 

The work consists of four movements:

The Serenade is written for two oboes, two clarinets, two bassoons and for three horns. The composer later added parts for cello and double bass to enhance the force of the bass line. The  contrabassoon part was attached ad lib, since in Dvořák's time it was not easy to obtain this unusual instrument.

In popular culture 

An excerpt from the third movement is performed by a chamber ensemble in a scene from the film Iron Jawed Angels.

In the movie Crescendo #makemusicnotwar, it is performed in an audition, by an Israeli ensemble.

Selected recordings 
Dvořák: Serenades in E major and in D minor. Supraphon (SU 3776-2 011). (Performed by the Czech Philharmonic Wind Ensemble)

Footnotes

References 
Jarmil Burghauser: Antonín Dvořák. Prague: Koniasch Latin Press, 2006.

External links
About Serenade for Winds on a comprehensive Dvorak site 

Performance of Serenade for Winds by the Gardner Chamber Orchestra conducted by Douglas Boyd, from the Isabella Stewart Gardner Museum in MP3 format

Chamber music by Antonín Dvořák
1878 compositions
Compositions in D minor